Rosalia (1130–1166), nicknamed  ("the Little Saint"), is the patron saint of Palermo in Italy, Camargo in Chihuahua, and three towns in Venezuela: El Hatillo,  Zuata, and El Playón. She is especially important internationally as a saint invoked in times of plague. From 2020 onwards she has been invoked by some citizens of Palermo to protect the city from COVID-19.

Biography 

 
Rosalia was born of a Norman noble family that claimed descent from Charlemagne. Devoutly religious, she retired to live as a hermit in a cave on Mount Pellegrino, where she died alone in 1166. Tradition says that she was led to the cave by two angels. On the cave wall she wrote "I, Rosalia, daughter of Sinibald, Lord of [Monte] delle Rose, and Quisquina, have taken the resolution to live in this cave for the love of my Lord, Jesus Christ."

1624 plague 
In 1624, a plague beset Palermo. During this hardship Rosalia reportedly appeared first to a sick woman, then to a hunter, to whom she indicated where her remains were to be found. She ordered him to bring her bones to Palermo and have them carried in procession through the city.

The hunter climbed the mountain and found her bones in the cave as described. He did what she had asked in the apparition. After her remains were carried around the city three times, the plague ceased. After this Rosalia was venerated as the patron saint of Palermo, and a sanctuary was built in the cave where her remains were discovered.

Her post-1624 iconography is dominated by the work of the Flemish painter Anthony van Dyck, who was trapped in the city during the 1624–1625 quarantine, during which time he produced five paintings of Rosalia, now in Madrid, Houston, London, New York and Palermo itself. In 1629 he also produced Saint Rosalia Interceding for the City of Palermo and Coronation of Saint Rosalia to assist Jesuit efforts to spread devotion to her beyond Sicily.

Controversy about the bones 

In 1825, geologist William Buckland was in Palermo during his honeymoon and asked to see the bones of Rosalia. After an examination of the relics the geologist determined them to be "non-human", in fact he declared the relic was actually the bones of a goat.

According to Buckland, priests said that Rosalia would not let him see her remains because he was not a Catholic Christian, and locked the relics away from people's eyes.

Veneration 

The feast of Saint Rosalia is on 4 September.

In Palermo, the Festino di Santa Rosalia is held each year on 14 July, and continues into the next day. It is a major social and religious event in the city.

The devotion to Santa Rosalia is widespread among the large and mainly Hindu Tamil community of Sri Lankan origin settled in Palermo.

On 4 September, a tradition of walking barefoot from Palermo up to the Sanctuary of Santa Rosalia high up on Mount Pellegrino is observed in honor of Rosalia. In Italian-American communities in the United States, the July feast is generally dedicated to Our Lady of Mount Carmel while the September feast, beginning in August, brings large numbers of visitors annually to the Bensonhurst section of Brooklyn in New York City.

In biology 

Rosalia was proposed as the patron saint of evolutionary studies in a paper by G.E. Hutchinson. This was due to a visit he paid to a pool of water downstream from the cave where St. Rosalia's remains were found, where he developed ideas based on observations of water boatman.

In art 

Saint Rosalia was an important subject in Italian Renaissance and Baroque painting, particularly in sacre conversazioni (group pictures of saints flanking the Virgin Mary) by artists such as Riccardo Quartararo, Mario di Laurito, Vincenzo La Barbara, and possibly Antonello da Messina. But it was Flemish master Anthony van Dyck (1599–1637), who was caught in Palermo during the 1624 plague, who produced the most paintings of her (see also above). His depictions  a young woman with flowing blonde hair, wearing a Franciscan cowl and reaching down toward the city of Palermo in its peril  became the standard iconography of Rosalia from that time onward. Van Dyck's series of St. Rosalia paintings have been studied by Gauvin Alexander Bailey and Xavier F. Salomon, both of whom curated or co-curated exhibitions devoted to the theme of Italian art and the plague. In March 2020, The New York Times published an article about the Metropolitan Museum of Art's painting of Saint Rosalia by Van Dyck in the context of COVID-19.

See also 

 Coronation of Saint Rosalia
 List of Catholic saints

References

External links 

 

1130 births
1166 deaths
Sicilian saints
Italian hermits
12th-century Christian saints
Female saints of medieval Italy
Angelic visionaries
Religious leaders from Palermo
Sicilian people of Norman descent
12th-century Sicilian people
Medieval Italian saints
12th-century Norman women